You're the Reason I'm Living is a 1963 album by Bobby Darin. It contains Country and Western music, often with a big band twist, and features arrangements by Jimmie Haskell, Shorty Rogers and Gerald Wilson. The title track was a number three hit single. The album reached number 43 on the Billboard 200 chart.

The album was built around the You're the Reason I'm Living single.  This (along with the flip-side, Now You're Gone) was recorded on December 3, 1962.  When the single became a bit hit, a decision was made to build an album of country songs around it.  These new songs were recorded on January 13–15, 1963.  It was the first time that Darin had consciously built an album around a hit single - Things and Other Things, featuring the hit Things, had been simply a pick-up album of leftovers released to cash-in on the single success.   The  production and release of You're the Reason I'm Living album had a knock-on effect on Darin's intended release schedule.  Earthy!, his album of folk songs from around the world, had been slated for release in February 1963 (and Darin had been promoting it on TV appearances), but was pushed back to July of that year.  Who Can I Count On is notable for being a duet with Merry Clayton (aka Mary Clayton), and was her first professional recording.

Reception

On release, BIllboard magazine called the album a "powerhouse package," and TV Radio Mirror said in their review that "Bobby certainly did these tunes up right."

Music critic Richie Unterberger called the release "a merely fair album that reflected a trend of the day. As on numerous Ray Charles country-pop cuts, the orchestration and backup vocals got a little overbearingly sappy sometimes. Swing jazz-like arrangements were applied to country material sometimes as well..."

Track listing

Side one
"Sally Was a Good Old Girl" (Harlan Howard) – 2:35
"Be Honest With Me" (Gene Autry, Fred Rose) – 2:25
"Oh, Lonesome Me" (Don Gibson) – 3:04
"(I Heard That) Lonesome Whistle"(Hank Williams, Jimmie Davis) – 2:43
"It Keeps Right On A-Hurtin'" (Johnny Tillotson) – 2:19
"You're the Reason I'm Living" (Bobby Darin) – 2:28

Side two
"Please Help Me, I'm Falling" (Don Robertson, Hal Blair) – 2:46
"Under Your Spell Again" (Buck Owens, Dusty Rhodes) – 2:51
"Here I Am" (Glen Campbell, Marc Douglas) – 2:32
"Who Can I Count On?" (Sammy Masters) (Duet with Merry Clayton) – 2:34
"Now You're Gone" (Darin) – 2:14
"Release Me (And Let Me Love You Again)" (Eddie Miller, Robert Yount, James Pebworth) – 2:51

References

1963 albums
Bobby Darin albums
Capitol Records albums
Albums arranged by Gerald Wilson
Albums arranged by Shorty Rogers
Albums produced by Nick Venet

Albums recorded at Capitol Studios